Pál (Paul) Böhm (28 December 1839, Nagyvárad - 29 March 1905, Munich) was a Hungarian genre painter.

Life and work
He first studied drawing with his father, who was a maintenance engineer at the bishop's manor. After finishing elementary school, he tried his hand at many crafts, including carpentry, coppersmithing and toy making. In 1862, he finally decided to become a painter, eventually travelling to Vienna, where he copied the works on display in the Belvedere Palace. In 1865, he returned to his hometown and attempted to make a living by painting portraits and altarpieces. He also briefly operated a painting school that was attended by László Paál.

Two years later, he was sufficiently established to earn a decent living and moved to Budapest, where he exhibited with the National Society of Hungarian Fine Arts. In 1871, he received a scholarship from Tivadar Pauler, the Minister of Religion and Education. This enabled him to travel to Munich, where he quickly became part of the city's artistic life and associated with a group of Hungarian painters led by Géza Mészöly. On several occasions, he stayed in the Tisza region, where he painted and sketched, but settled in Munich permanently in 1875. After this point, his paintings lost some of their freshness and are generally considered by critics to be rather commercial.

Selected paintings

References

Further reading 
 György Seregélyi: Magyar festők és grafikusok adattára (Database of Hungarian Painters and Graphic Artists), Szeged, 1988, 
 Művészeti lexikon (Art Lexicon) (edited by Nóra Aradi), Akadémiai Kiadó, 1983, 
 Károly Lyka: Nemzeti romantika (National Romanticism), Corvina Kiadó, Budapest, 1982,

External links 

 Művészet An appreciation and brief biography of Böhm by Viktor Olgyai.
 ArtNet: More works by Böhm

Genre painters
Orientalism
Orientalist painters
People from Oradea
1839 births
1905 deaths
19th-century Hungarian painters
19th-century male artists
Hungarian male painters